The Archdiocese of Ravenna-Cervia is a metropolitan archdiocese of the Roman Catholic Church in the Emilia-Romagna region of Italy.
 
The cathedral of the archdiocese is the Cathedral Basilica of the Resurrection of Our Lord in Ravenna; the Cathedral of Saint Peter in Cervia is the co-cathedral of the archdiocese.

The current Metropolitan Archbishop of the Roman Catholic Archdiocese of Ravenna-Cervia, since his appointment by Pope Benedict XVI on Saturday, November 17, 2012, is Lorenzo Ghizzoni.

History 

The Archdiocese of Ravenna was a Roman Catholic diocese in Emilia-Romagna, Italy. The archdiocese was erected in the 1st century as a diocese, and was elevated to an archdiocese in the 6th century. Among its famous archbishops are Saint Peter Chrysologus, a Doctor of the Church, and Saint Guido Maria Conforti, who was canonized as a saint in 2011 by Pope Benedict XVI. The early medieval Ravenna papyri form an important record from the church's chancery between the 5th and 10th century.

The archdiocese was created in 1947 through the merger of the Archdiocese of Ravenna and the Diocese of Cervia.  The archdiocese in 2014 had one priest for every 1,830 Catholics.

See also 
 Bishop of Ravenna, for a complete list of bishops

References

Further reading 
 Agnellus, Andreas (1708); Bacchini, Benedetto (ed.) Agnelli Liber Pontificalis, sive; Vitæ Pontificum Ravennatum Mutinæ: Typis Antonii Capponii ..., MDCCVIII. 2 pt. ([16], 372, 164 p. [12] leaves of plates (incl. fontispiece, 11 folded); 503, [1] p., [1] leaf of plates : ill., geneal. tables; 4to.
Later editions 1723; in Patrologia Latina; and 2006
 Pallotti, Riccardo (2015). "L'antipapa Clemente III e il governo dell'Esarcato tra Impero, Papato e signorie comitali." In: Ravenna Studi e Ricerche, XXII (2015), fasc. 1 (gennaio-dicembre), pp. 155-198.

External links 
 Metropolitan Archdiocese of Ravenna-Cervia

Roman Catholic dioceses in Emilia-Romagna
Dioceses established in the 1st century